Chal Seyyed Ali (also Romanized as Chāl Seyyed ʿAlī) is a village in Itivand-e Shomali Rural District, Kakavand District, Delfan County, Lorestan Province, Iran. At the 2006 census, its population was 125, in 28 families.

References 

Towns and villages in Delfan County